Matthew F. Hale (born July 27, 1971) is an American white supremacist, neo-Nazi leader and convicted felon. Hale was the founder of the East Peoria, Illinois-based white separatist group then known as the World Church of the Creator (now called The Creativity Movement), and he declared himself its Pontifex Maximus (Latin for "highest priest") in continuation of the Church of the Creator organization founded by Ben Klassen in 1973.

In 1998, Hale was barred from practicing law in Illinois by the state panel responsible for evaluating the character and fitness of prospective lawyers. The panel stated that Hale's incitement of racial hatred, for the ultimate purpose of depriving selected groups of their legal rights, was blatantly immoral and rendered him unfit to be a lawyer.

In 2005, Hale was sentenced to a 40-year federal prison term for encouraging an undercover Federal Bureau of Investigation (FBI) informant to kill federal judge Joan Lefkow. As of July 2020, Hale was transferred out of ADX Florence and into United States Penitentiary, Marion in Illinois. His current projected release date is April 2, 2037.

Early life
Hale was born in 1971 and raised in East Peoria, Illinois, a city on the Illinois River. After his parents divorced when he was nine years old, Hale was raised solely by his father, a police officer. By the age of 12, Matt Hale was reading books about Nazism, including Adolf Hitler's Mein Kampf, and had formed a Nazi-themed group at his school.

In August 1989, Hale entered Bradley University, studying political science. After failing to form a "White Student Union" at Bradley, Hale attempted to lead a series of political organizations in a short period: He founded the American White Supremacist Party, but it failed to attract many members; he then dissolved the AWSP in 1990 and attempted to form a chapter of the David Duke incarnation of the National Association for the Advancement of White People, but the chapter was not recognized by the national organization. In 1992 he declared himself the National Leader of the National Socialist White Americans' Party, without having any local members; he disbanded that organization in 1995.

Around 1990, Hale burned an Israeli flag , leading to a fine from East Peoria for open burning. The next year, he passed out racist pamphlets to patrons  and was fined for littering. In  1991, Hale and his brother allegedly threatened three African-Americans with a gun. Hale was arrested  and because he refused to tell police where his brother was, he was also charged with  obstruction of justice. Hale was convicted of obstruction, but won a reversal on appeal. In 1992, Hale attacked a security guard at a mall and was charged with criminal trespass, resisting arrest, aggravated battery and carrying a concealed weapon. For this attack, Hale was sentenced to six months of house arrest and 30 months of probation.

Meanwhile, by 1992, Hale had become involved with an organization called the Church of the Creator. The church believed, and its successors believe, that a "racial holy war" is necessary to attain a "white world" without Jews and non-whites. To this end, it encourages its members to "populate the lands of this earth with white people exclusively." The COTC's founder, Ben Klassen, committed suicide on August 7, 1993, leaving the organization listless and owing a default judgment of $1 million to the family of a murder victim. Though this was the first such organization Hale had been involved in without appointing himself as leader, he soon achieved the same effect: switching his leadership identity from a political party to religious, Hale dissolved his NSWAP and formed a "New" Church of the Creator in 1995 and told followers of Klassen's organization that Hale was the type of leader Klassen had wished for; and in Montana on July 27, 1996, the COTC's Guardians of the Faith Committee renamed the organization to the "World Church of the Creator" and anointed Hale as "Pontifex Maximus".

Denial of law license
Hale began at the Southern Illinois University School of Law in 1995, graduating in May 1998 and passing the Illinois state bar examination in July of the same year.

On December 16, 1998, the Illinois Bar Committee on Character and Fitness rejected Hale's application for a license to practice law. Hale appealed, and a hearing was held on April 10, 1999. On June 30, 1999, a Hearing Panel of the Committee refused to certify that Hale had the requisite moral character and fitness to practice law in Illinois. Attorney Glenn Greenwald represented Hale in a failed federal lawsuit to overturn the licensing decision. The U.S. District Court for the Northern District of Illinois concluded it did not have jurisdiction to review an earlier decision of the Illinois Supreme Court upholding the license denial. The Seventh Circuit Court of Appeals upheld that decision in an opinion filed on July 14, 2003.

Two days after Hale was denied a license to practice law, a World Church of the Creator member and college student, Benjamin Smith, went on a three-day shooting spree in which he randomly targeted members of racial and ethnic minority groups in Illinois and Indiana. Smith killed two people and wounded ten others before committing suicide on July 4. Mark Potok, director of intelligence for the Southern Poverty Law Center, believes that Smith may have acted in retaliation after Hale's application to practice law was rejected.

During a television interview in the summer of 1999, Hale stated that his "church does not condone violent or illegal activities".

Court trials and federal convictions

In 2000, a religious group in Oregon called the Church of the Creator sued Hale's organization, the World Church of the Creator, for trademark infringement.

Hale filed a lawsuit against Judge Joan Lefkow, the United States district court judge presiding over the trademark infringement case who, after an appeal, had ruled against Hale's organization. Hale stated that the WCOTC was in a "state of war" with Lefkow, and denounced Lefkow in a news conference, claiming that she was biased against him because she was married to a Jewish man and had biracial grandchildren.

On January 8, 2003, Hale was arrested, charged with soliciting an undercover Federal Bureau of Investigation (FBI) informant named Tony Evola to kill Lefkow. The FBI sent Evola to join the World Church of the Creator after Hale gave a speech at the funeral of Benjamin Smith. In March 2000, Evola attended his first World Church of the Creator meeting and won Hale's trust by confronting a protester to the organization. At a meeting the next month in April 2000, Hale invited Evola to be his "head of security" which entailed arranging Hale's travel plans and serving as a personal bodyguard. 

During his tenure as bodyguard, Evola recorded conversations that would be later used as evidence against Hale. In a recorded conversation on June 17, 2000, Hale described Smith as a "good man" and a "comrade". On June 23, Hale told Evola and two other followers that he wished Smith "hadn't done it" and lamented the difficulty of nonviolent resistance through the courts without a license to practice law. On June 29, Evola recorded Hale stating that he “personally still [had the] intention” to follow the law himself because he was being “watched all the time”. 

On June 30, 2000, the Supreme Court of the United States refused Hale's appeal to challenge the state of Illinois's denial of his license to practice law. In response Hale recorded on his voicemail that his followers "are free according to our own conscience to take whatever actions we deem necessary to resist this tyranny." 

On December 3, 2000, Evola asked Hale, "What are we gonna do about this traitor?" to which Hale responded "[A]ll we can do at this point is be legal and peaceful and follow the rules." On December 17, 2000, Hale communicated with Evola in an Internet chatroom. Evola asked Hale about rats in reference to a former member's testimony against the World Church of the Creator in court to which Hale replied, "Of course, it is very important that I be able to say truthfully that I have never advocated anything illegal," yet he "wouldn't mind if something happens to big rats. But I would never want to involve myself in such things." On January 11, 2001, Evola fabricated a story that "everything's in motion" to which Hale responded "I think it would be best, you know, I think it would be best that nothing happened." 

Evola further pursued the possibility of a fabricated assassination to which Hale responded the former member had "already been deposed” so killing him was a futile decision. Evola persisted and Hale replied "I'm gonna have to say no to this and I have to say no for a number of reasons." Evola offered to provide Hale with an alibi for the murder, and Hale declined because "what I would be doing or what I would be authorizing would be grounds for disbarment if I had a license and I just hate to go [sic] that." Evola persisted to which Hale stated  "I don't want to ever hear about it again." The next day Hale sent an email to Evola about the "idea" and stated, "I must veto it." Hale wrote, "You are very persuasive and obviously I think extremely well of you for your idea," but he concluded, "I must instruct you not to proceed." The discussions between Evola and Hale about Ken Dippold served as a prelude to further discussions about Joan Humphrey Lefkow in December 2002, in which Evola asked if "we gonna exterminate (Lefkow)", to which Hale replied "If you wish to, ah, do anything yourself, you can, you know?".

On February 28, 2005, Lefkow's mother and husband were murdered at her home on Chicago's North Side. Chicago police revealed on March 10 that Bart Ross, a plaintiff in a medical malpractice case that Lefkow had dismissed, admitted to the murders in a suicide note written before shooting himself during a routine traffic stop in Wisconsin the previous evening. The murders and suicide were unrelated to Hale or Creativity.

On April 6, 2005, Hale was sentenced to a 40-year prison term exactly one year after the trial began for attempting to solicit Lefkow's murder. U.S. District Court Judge James Moody presided over the sentencing. During the trial, jurors heard more than a dozen tapes of Hale using racial slurs, including one in which he joked about Benjamin Smith's shooting spree. According to prosecutors, Hale had asked one of his followers named Anthony Evola to kill Lefkow.

In June 2016, Hale was transferred out of ADX Florence to medium-security federal prison FCI Terre Haute, Indiana, but by late 2017 was back at Florence. In July 2020, Hale was transferred out of ADX once again, this time to USP Marion, a medium-security institution in Illinois.

Hale's projected release date is April 2, 2036. If he is released on that date, he will be 64 years old.

References

Further reading

External links

1971 births
21st-century criminals
Alt-right activists
American atheists
American Holocaust deniers
American members of the clergy convicted of crimes
American white supremacists
Antisemitism in the United States
Bradley University alumni
Creativity (religion)
Illinois Independents
Inmates of ADX Florence
Journalists from Illinois
Living people
People convicted of soliciting murder
People from East Peoria, Illinois
Perpetrators of religiously motivated violence in the United States
Southern Illinois University School of Law alumni